A list of Portuguese films that were first released in 2012. 29 Portuguese films were released, including 26 feature films, accounting for 4.9% of the total box office gross, 5.3% of the total number of admissions and 9% of the total number of films in Portugal.

See also
2012 in Portugal

References

2012
Lists of 2012 films by country or language
2012 in Portugal